Herb Andress (January 10, 1935, in Bad Goisern – April 8, 2004, in Munich), born Herbert Andreas Greunz, was an Austrian film and television actor, known particularly for his roles in the Rainer Werner Fassbinder film Lili Marleen (1981) and the same director's TV series Eight Hours Don't Make a Day (1972).

Herb Andress later played in the television series Monaco Franze, Tatort, and Polizeiruf 110. Herb Andress died of cancer at the age of 69.

Selected filmography

 Chaque jour a son secret (1958) - Minor Role (uncredited)
 Combat! (1964-1966, TV Series) - German Lieutenant / German #2
 My Favorite Martian (1965-1966, TV Series) - Assistant / Mechanical Man
 The Ghost in the Invisible Bikini (1966) - Statue (uncredited)
 Movie Star, American Style or; LSD, I Hate You (1966) - Venda
 What Did You Do in the War, Daddy? (1966) - German Lieutenant (uncredited)
 The Battle of the Damned (1969) - German Pilot
 Rangers: attacco ora X (1970) - SS Officer
 Churchill's Leopards (1970) - Royal Marine
 Beware of a Holy Whore (1971) - Mark, Coach
 The Last Rebel (1971) - Lieutenant
 Lady Frankenstein (1971) - Hunchback (uncredited)
 The Big Bust-Out (1972) - Little Ivan
 Eight Hours Don't Make a Day (1972-1973, TV Mini-Series) - Rüdiger
 Who? (1974) - FBI Agent
 Ordine firmato in bianco (1974) - Michel Werther
 Delitto d'autore (1974)
  (1976) - Assistant to the Director (uncredited)
 Casanova & Co. (1977) - Nobleman (uncredited)
 The Expulsion from Paradise (1977) - Andy Paulisch
 Die Totenschmecker (1979) - Kurt
 Der Durchdreher (1979) - Ameriakner
  (1980)
 Lili Marleen (1981) - Reintgen
 Sei zärtlich, Pinguin (1982)
 Die Frau mit dem roten Hut (1984) - Director
 Red Heat (1985) - Werner
 Enemy Mine (1985) - Hopper
 Hell Hunters (1987) - Johann
  (1988)
 Gardemarines-III (1992) - Frederick the Great
 Brennendes Herz (1996)
  (1996, TV Movie) - Eriksen
 Lo strano caso del signor Kappa (2001) - Avvocato Uldi
 Der kleine Mann (2001) - Stromberg
 She Me and Her (2002) - Rudi
 Taxi für eine Leiche (2002) - Ingenieur
 Luther (2003) - Gunter
 Baltic Storm (2003) - Juri Roos

External links

Official website

1935 births
2004 deaths
People from Bad Goisern
Austrian male film actors
Austrian male television actors
20th-century Austrian male actors
21st-century Austrian male actors
Deaths from cancer in Germany